Chicken Creek is a ghost town in southeastern Juab County, Utah, United States.

History
Two families from Nephi established a ranch on Chicken Creek, in 1860. By 1864 it had grown into a settlement called Chicken Creek and had acquired its own post office. By 1871, Levan's success as a farming community led to Chicken Creek gradually being abandoned. Its post office was closed in 1876; only a few ruins of foundations and fireplaces remained.

See also

 List of ghost towns in Utah

References

External links

Mormon Road
Chicken Creek, Utah
Ghost towns in Juab County, Utah
Populated places established in 1860